The 1905 Kendall Orange and Black football team represented Henry Kendall College—now known as the University of Tulsa—as an independent during the 1905 college football season. Led by Applegate in his first and only season as head coach, Kendall compiled a record of 2–3.

Schedule

References

Kendall
Tulsa Golden Hurricane football seasons
Kendall Orange and Black football
Kendall Orange and Black football